Fredrick Basnett (10 November 1924 – 1997) was an English professional footballer who played for Stoke City.

Career
Basnett played for Stoke City during World War II along with his brother Albert. He was a useful goalscorer in the war leagues and made two appearances in the FA Cup in the 1945–46 season. At the end of the war Basnett left Stoke and went on to play for non-league Northwich Victoria.

Career statistics

References

English footballers
Stoke City F.C. players
1924 births
Northwich Victoria F.C. players
1997 deaths
Association football forwards